Wustrow (from a Slavic word for island) may refer to the following places in Germany:

Wustrow, Lower Saxony, a town in the district Lüchow-Dannenberg, Lower Saxony
Wustrow, Mecklenburg-Strelitz, a municipality in the district Mecklenburg-Strelitz, Mecklenburg-Vorpommern
Wustrow, Nordvorpommern, a municipality in the district Nordvorpommern, Mecklenburg-Vorpommern